Olivella hyphala is a species of small sea snail, marine gastropod mollusk in the subfamily Olivellinae, in the family Olividae, the olives.  Species in the genus Olivella are commonly called dwarf olives.

Description
The length of the shell varies between 5 mm and 12 mm

Distribution
This marine species occurs off the Abrolhos Archipelago, East Brazil.

References

External links
 Absalão, R. S. & Pimenta, A. D. (2003). A new subgenus and three new species of Brazilian deep water Olivella Swainson, 1831 (Mollusca, Gastropoda, Olivellidae) collected by the RV Marion Dufresne in 1987. Zoosystema. 25 (2): 177-185

hyphala
Gastropods described in 2003